Ham Chan-Mi (born May 2, 1994 in Gangwon-do) is a South Korean swimmer, who specialized in backstroke events. Ham is a two-time finalist in both 100 and 200 m backstroke at the 2010 Asian Games in Guangzhou, China.

Ham qualified for the women's 200 m backstroke at the 2012 Summer Olympics in London, by eclipsing a FINA B-standard entry time of 2:14.88 from the FINA World Championships in Shanghai, China. Ham challenged four other swimmers on the first heat, including two-time Olympian Carolina Colorado of Colombia. She raced to third place by more than a second behind Colorado, outside her entry time of 2:15.30. Ham failed to advance into the semifinals, as she placed thirty-first overall in the preliminary heats.

References

External links
NBC Olympics Profile

1994 births
Living people
South Korean female backstroke swimmers
Olympic swimmers of South Korea
Swimmers at the 2012 Summer Olympics
Swimmers at the 2010 Asian Games
Sportspeople from Gangwon Province, South Korea
Asian Games competitors for South Korea
21st-century South Korean women